Judge Torres may refer to:

Analisa Torres (born 1959), judge of the United States District Court for the Southern District of New York
Ernest C. Torres (born 1941, judge of the United States District Court for the District of Rhode Island
Florentino Torres (1844–1927), judge of the Court of First Instance of Ilocos Sur, and later associate justice of the Supreme Court of the Philippines